Team Unicorn is a multimedia production team formed in Los Angeles, California, in 2010. Its current members are American actresses Clare Grant, Rileah Vanderbilt, Milynn Sarley, and Alison Haislip (who replaced Michele Boyd in 2014). The group is known for producing parody song videos such as "G33k & G4m3r Girls", a spoof of Katy Perry's "California Gurls", and  "All About that Base", a Star Wars parody of Meghan Trainor's song "All About That Bass". The group had a pilot on Adult Swim called The Team Unicorn Saturday Action Fun Hour!, and have attended numerous science fiction and comic conventions.

History

Rileah Vanderbilt is largely given credit to bringing the four women of Team Unicorn together. She and Clare Grant produced geek videos together and won two awards at the 2009 Star Wars Fan Film Awards for their short "Saber". Vanderbilt became friends with Milynn Sarley in 2009, and Michele Boyd was introduced in January 2010.

The group released its debut parody song "G33k & G4m3r Girls" online in September 2010. The music video, spoofing Katy Perry's "California Gurls", is filled with geek cultural references and pays tribute to women who love gaming, manga, and science fiction. The video reached 1 million views in its first week online, but met with some mixed responses to its portrayal of the women.

On December 7, 2014, Team Unicorn released "All About That Base", a parody of the Meghan Trainor song "All About That Bass", with the tagline lyric being "No Rebels". The video has a Star Wars theme and featured stormtroopers dancing alongside cheerleaders dressed in attire inspired by Darth Vader. Mitchell Peters of Billboard opined that the parody was "catchy" and "hilarious", while Donna Dickens of HitFix questioned whether the video sent the wrong message by "tacitly saying it's okay for geek girls to exist, only so long as they are acceptably 'hot'".

In 2013, Adult Swim announced a development agreement with the creators of Robot Chicken for a Team Unicorn live action/animation hybrid pilot called The Team Unicorn Saturday Action Fun Hour! which was intended to introduce Alison Haislip as the new Blue Unicorn, and star Jane Lynch, Alan Tudyk, Tara Strong, and Kevin Shinick, but it was never made.

Filmography

Videos

Appearances

Awards and nominations

References

External links 

 
 

 
American pop music groups
Musical groups established in 2010
Musical quartets
Nerd culture
Cosplayers
2010 establishments in California
All-female bands